70048 The Territorial Army 1908–1958 was a British Railways BR standard class 7 (also known as Britannia class) steam locomotive, named after the Territorial Army, a part of the British Army.

Career
She was built at a cost of £23,445 at Crewe Works being completed on 8 July 1954. She was allocated a BR1D 'high sided' tender number 982 and allocated to Holyhead depot.

Initially unnamed, it was not until 23 July 1958 when she was given her title by the Duke of Norfolk. It was probably no coincidence that the engine's driver on the day was Fred Brookes, himself a former Territorial.  At the naming ceremony, Mr David Blee, General Manager of the London Midland Region, recognised that with the increasing use of diesel haulage it was likely that 70048 would not remain in service for much longer and that the name The Territorial Army 1908–1958 would be transferred to a diesel-electric locomotive although it never happened.

During her life she was allocated to various depots including Chester, Willesden, Newton Heath, Annesley, Aston, Carlisle Upperby and finally Carlisle Kingmoor. It was from this shed that she was finally withdrawn from service on 6 May 1967 and scrapped on 12 September 1967.

Commemoration
On 8 November 2008 preserved sister loco No. 70013 'Oliver Cromwell' was temporarily re-numbered as 70048 and temporarily renamed 'Territorial Army 1908–2008' as part of a ceremony to commorate the 100th anniversary of the Territorial Army. The new name was carried on the left hand side smoke deflector, with the original 'Territorial Army 1908–1958' nameplate on the right.  The naming was performed by the Duke of Gloucester at Quorn station on the preserved Great Central Railway.

References

70048
4-6-2 locomotives
Individual locomotives of Great Britain
Railway locomotives introduced in 1954
Scrapped locomotives